Colonel George Alvin Loud (June 18, 1852 – November 13, 1925) was a politician and businessman from the U.S. state of Michigan.

Loud was born in Bainbridge Township, Geauga County, Ohio, and moved with his parents (Henry M. Loud and Vilitta Kile) to Massachusetts in 1856 and then to Au Sable, Michigan, in 1866. He attended the English High School in Boston, and Professor Patterson's School at Detroit, He graduated from Ann Arbor High School (now Pioneer High School) in 1869. He was vice president and general manager of the Au Sable and Northwestern Railroad. For four years he was a colonel on the staff of Michigan Governor Hazen S. Pingree. He was paymaster on the U.S. revenue cutter McCulloch when it participated in the Battle of Manila Bay during the Spanish–American War.

Loud was elected as a Republican from Michigan's 10th congressional district to the 58th United States Congress and to the four succeeding Congresses, serving from March 4, 1903, to March 3, 1913. In 1912, Loud was defeated by Progressive Roy O. Woodruff. Loud defeated Woodruff in 1914 to be elected to the 64th Congress, serving from March 4, 1915, to March 3, 1917. In 1916, Loud was defeated in the Republican Party primary elections by Gilbert A. Currie.

Loud returned to engage in the lumber business at Au Sable. He was killed in an automobile accident at Myrtle Point, Oregon, and was interred in Au Sable Cemetery in Oscoda.

References

 The Political Graveyard

External links
 

1852 births
1925 deaths
Road incident deaths in Oregon
Republican Party members of the United States House of Representatives from Michigan
People from Bainbridge, Geauga County, Ohio
People from Iosco County, Michigan
Politicians from Ann Arbor, Michigan